A shedding-type card game is a game in which the player's objective is to empty one's hand of all cards before all other players.

Games with action/power/trick cards
In these games, players win by having the fewest points.

 Crazy Eights
 Craits
 One Card
 Cabo
 Switch

Progressively add rules
 Bartok
 Mao

One suit per player
 Red nines

One deck per pair

Players play in pairs, shed sets of cards for points and win by reaching a certain point value.
 Biriba
 Canasta

Different trump suit per player 
 Farmer Henry

Bluffing
 Cheat

Proprietary

 Boom-O
 Castle
 Lexicon
 Phase 10
 Scrabble Slam!
 Taki
 Uno
 Whot

Miscellaneous
 Cards in the hat
 Speed

Other
 Pits

Card game terminology